Michel Weber may refer to:

 Michel Weber (canoeist), Swiss former slalom canoeist
 Michel Weber (philosopher), (born 1963) Belgian philosopher